Tarsocera fulvina, the Karoo widow, is a butterfly of the family Nymphalidae. It is found in South Africa in the western Cape from the Hex River Mountains to the Roggeveld escarpment and the Sneeuberg, south to Grootwindhoekberge in the eastern Cape.

The wingspan is 42–52 mm for males and 50–57 mm for females. Adults are on wing from September to December (with a peak in October or November). There is one generation per year

The larvae probably feed on various Poaceae species.

References

Butterflies described in 1971
Satyrini